Lahcène Amar Nazef (born September 2, 1974 in Algiers, Algeria) is an Algerian football player who is currently playing as a midfielder for WA Boufarik in the Algerian third division.

Career statistics

Club

Club career
 1992-1997 MC Alger
 1997-2002 JS Kabylie
 2002-2003 NA Hussein Dey
 2003-2005 USM Alger
 2005-2006 JSM Béjaïa
 2006-2006 MC Oran
 2006-     WA Boufarik

Honours
 Won the CAF Cup two times with JS Kabylie in 2000 and 2001
 Won the Algerian Championnat National once with USM Alger in 2005
 Won the Algerian Cup once with USM Alger in 2003
 Chosen as the Best Player in the Algerian League in the 2000/2001 season by sports daily Competition
 Has 8 caps for the Algerian National Team

References

External links
 NAZEF Lahcène

1974 births
Algerian footballers
Algeria international footballers
Living people
JS Kabylie players
Kabyle people
People from El Biar
USM Alger players
NA Hussein Dey players
MC Oran players
JSM Béjaïa players
JS El Biar players
Association football defenders
WA Boufarik players
21st-century Algerian people